Giuseppe Maria Asclepi (1706–1776) was an Italian astronomer and physician.  He was a Jesuit and director of the observatory at the Collegio Romano.

The lunar crater Asclepi is named after him.

Works 

 Nuova proprietà delle potenze de 'numeri
 Tentamen novae de odoribus theorie, Siena, 1749.
 
 De veneris per solem transitu exercitatio astronomica habita in Collegio Romano, Rome, 1761.
 De motum gravium rectilineo, Rome, 1762-1763.
 De objectivi micrometri usu in planetarum diametris metiendis. Exercitatio optico-astronomica habita in Collegio Romano a Patribus Societatis Jesu, Rome, 1765.
 
 De cometarum motu exercitatio astronomica habita in collegio Romano patribus Societatis Jesu.Prid.Non.Septem, Rome, 1769.

See also
List of Jesuit scientists
List of Roman Catholic scientist-clerics

1706 births
1776 deaths
18th-century Italian astronomers
18th-century Italian Jesuits
18th-century Italian physicians
Jesuit scientists